Bedford Aerodrome  is located  north of Bedford, in Bedfordshire, England. The aerodrome which is privately owned serves the Bedford Autodrome.

References

Airports in Bedfordshire
Airports in the East of England